The New Ashok Nagar is a residential area which has its own metro station on the Blue Line of the Delhi Metro.

Station layout

Facilities 
New Ashok Nagar metro station has the following stores: 
Domino's, KFC

List of available ATM at New Ashok Nagar metro station are
State Bank of India, Punjab National Bank, Federal Bank

Parking

Connections 

Auto-rickshaw and E-rickshaw services are available from New Ashok Nagar metro station to Vasundhara Enclave, Dharamshila Cancer Hospital, New Ashok Nagar Police Chowki and supermarkets like Plaza Market or DDA Market.

See also 
List of Delhi Metro stations
Transport in Delhi
Delhi Metro Rail Corporation
Delhi Suburban Railway
List of rapid transit systems in India

References

External links 
 Delhi Metro Rail Corporation Ltd. (Official site)
 Delhi Metro Annual Reports
 
 UrbanRail.Net – descriptions of all metro systems in the world, each with a schematic map showing all stations.

Delhi Metro stations
Railway stations opened in 2009
Railway stations in East Delhi district